Peter Zoller (born 16 September 1952) is a theoretical physicist from Austria. He is Professor at the University of Innsbruck and works on quantum optics and quantum information and is best known for his pioneering research on quantum computing and quantum communication and for bridging quantum optics and solid state physics.

Biography
Peter Zoller studied physics at the University of Innsbruck, obtained his doctorate there in February 1977, and became a lecturer at their Institute of Theoretical Physics. For 1978/79, he was granted a Max Kade stipend to research with Peter Lambropoulos at the University of Southern California. In 1980, he stayed at the University of Waikato in Hamilton, New Zealand, as a researcher with the group around Dan Walls. In 1981, Peter Zoller handed in his book "Über die lichtstatistische Abhängigkeit resonanter Multiphoton-Prozesse" at the University of Innsbruck to qualify as a professor by receiving the "venia docendi". He spent 1981/82 and 1988 as visiting fellow at the Joint Institute for Laboratory Astrophysics (JILA) of the University of Colorado, Boulder, and 1986 as guest professor at the Université de Paris-Sud 11, Orsay. In 1991, Peter Zoller was appointed Professor of Physics and JILA Fellow at JILA and at the Physics Department of the University of Colorado, Boulder. At the end of 1994, he accepted a chair at the University of Innsbruck, where he has worked ever since. From 1995 to 1999, he headed the Institute of Theoretical Physics, from 2001 to 2004, he was vice-dean of studies. Peter Zoller continues to keep in close touch with JILA as Adjoint Fellow.  Numerous guest professorships have taken him to all major centers of physics throughout the world. He was Loeb lecturer in Harvard, Boston, MA (2004) and Yan Jici chair professor at the University of Science and Technology of China, Hefei, chair professor at Tsinghua University, Beijing (2004), Lorentz professor at the University of Leiden in the Netherlands (2005), Distinguished Lecturer at the Technion in Haifa (2007), Moore Distinguished Scholar at Caltech (2008/2010) and Arnold Sommerfeld Lecturer at LMU München (2010). In 2012/13 he was "Distinguished Fellow" at the Max Planck Institute of Quantum Optics in Garching, Munich. In 2014 he has been elected as an "External Scientific Member" at the Max Planck Institute of Quantum Optics. In 2015 he held the International Jacques Solvay Chair in Physics at the University of Brussels . Since 2003, Peter Zoller has also held the position of Scientific Director at the Institute for Quantum Optics and Quantum Information (IQOQI) of the Austrian Academy of Sciences.

In 2018, Peter Zoller co-founded Alpine Quantum Technologies, a quantum computing hardware company.

Research
As a theoretician, Peter Zoller has written major works on the interaction of laser light and atoms. In addition to fundamental developments in quantum optics he has succeeded in bridging quantum information and solid state physics. The model of a quantum computer, suggested by him and Ignacio Cirac in 1995, is based on the interaction of lasers with cold ions confined in an electromagnetic trap. The principles of this idea have been implemented in experiments over recent years and it is considered one of the most promising concepts for the development of a scalable quantum computer. Zoller and his researcher colleagues have also managed to link quantum physics with solid state physics. One of his suggestions has been to build a quantum simulator with cold atoms and use it to research hitherto unexplained phenomena in high temperature superconductors. Zoller's ideas and concepts attract widespread interest within the scientific community and his works are highly cited.

Books 
Peter Zoller and Crispin Gardiner have jointly written the books
 C W Gardiner and Peter Zoller:  Quantum Noise;  Springer, Berlin Heidelberg, 2nd ed. 1999, 3rd ed. 2004
 Crispin Gardiner and Peter Zoller: The Quantum World of Ultra-Cold Atoms and Light Book I:  Foundations of Quantum Optics, Imperial College Press, London and Singapore 2014.
 Crispin Gardiner and Peter Zoller: The Quantum World of Ultra-Cold Atoms and Light Book II:  Physics of Quantum Optical Devices, Imperial College Press, London and Singapore 2015.
 Crispin Gardiner and Peter Zoller: The Quantum World of Ultra-Cold Atoms and Light Book III:  Ultra-Cold Atoms, World Scientific, London and Singapore 2014.

Awards
Peter Zoller has received numerous awards for his achievements in the field of quantum optics and quantum information and especially for his pioneering work on quantum computers and quantum communication. These include the Micius Quantum Prize (2018), the Willis E. Lamb Award for Laser Science and Quantum Optics (2018), the Herbert Walther Award from the OSA (2016), the Wolf Prize in Physics (with Juan Ignacio Cirac) (2013), the "Hamburger Preis für theoretische Physik" (2011), the Blaise Pascal Medal in Physics (2011), The Franklin Institute's 2010 Benjamin Franklin Medal in Physics (with Juan Ignacio Cirac and David Wineland), the 2008 BBVA Foundation Frontiers of Knowledge Award, in the Basic Sciences category (ex aequo with Ignacio Cirac), the Dirac Medal (2006), the 6th International Quantum Communication Award (2006), the Niels Bohr/UNESCO Gold Medal (2005), the Max Planck Medal (2005) of the Deutsche Physikalische Gesellschaft, the Humboldt Research Award (2000), the Schrödinger Prize (1998) of the Austrian Academy of Sciences, the Max Born Award (1998) of the Optical Society of America, as well as the Wittgenstein Award (1998), Austria's highest scientific accolade, the Ludwig Boltzmann Prize (1983) of the Austrian Physical Society. 
In 2001, Peter Zoller became full member of the Austrian Academy of Sciences, in 2008 he was elected to the United States National Academy of Sciences and the Royal Netherlands Academy of Arts and Sciences, in 2009 to the Spanish Royal Academy of Sciences, in 2010 to the German Academy of Sciences Leopoldina, in 2012 to the European Academy of Sciences, and in 2013 to the Academia Europaea. In 2019 he has received the honorary doctorate of the University of Colorado Boulder and in 2012 one of the University of Amsterdam.

See also 
 Open quantum system
 Quantum jump method

References

External links

Biography Peter Zoller
Peter Zoller’s Thomson Reuters RESEARCHERID

1952 births
Living people
Austrian physicists
Quantum physicists
Optical physicists
University of Innsbruck alumni
University of Southern California alumni
Harvard University staff
University of Colorado faculty
Academic staff of Paris-Sud University
Academic staff of the University of Innsbruck
Members of the Austrian Academy of Sciences
Members of the Royal Netherlands Academy of Arts and Sciences
Foreign associates of the National Academy of Sciences
Members of Academia Europaea
UNESCO Niels Bohr Medal recipients
Wolf Prize in Physics laureates
Members of the German Academy of Sciences Leopoldina
Quantum information scientists
Winners of the Max Planck Medal
Fellows of the American Physical Society